The Tiger Mask donation phenomenon is a series of donations of randoseru (school backpacks) and other items to orphanages around Japan. The first donation happened when someone left ten 30,000-yen backpacks at a child guidance center in Gunma Prefecture on Christmas Day in 2010. A note attached to the bags was signed "Naoto Date", the real name of the titular character of Tiger Mask, a popular 1960s and 70s manga about a wrestler who fought for orphans, being raised in an orphanage himself. Since the initial donation, copycat donations have appeared around Japan at various facilities for children, ranging from more backpacks to toys, food, and monetary gifts.

Naoto Date/Tiger Mask background

Many of the donations have been made under the name of Naoto Date, a character in the manga and anime Tiger Mask. In the manga and anime, Tiger Mask (whose real name was Naoto Date) was a feared heel wrestler in America who was extremely vicious in the ring. However, he became a face after returning to Japan when a young boy said that he wanted to be a villain like Tiger Mask when he grew up. The boy lived in an orphanage, the same one that Tiger Mask grew up in during his childhood. Feeling that he did not want the boy to idolize a villain, Tiger was inspired to be a heroic wrestler and fights for the children in the orphanage.

Donations

First donation
On 25 December 2010, in Maebashi City, Gunma Prefecture, a child guidance center was visited by someone leaving ten 30,000-yen (about US$360) backpacks: five black backpacks wrapped with blue ribbons, and five red backpacks wrapped with pink ribbons. A card attached to the bags simply said:

Please use these backpacks for the children.

(signed) Naoto Date 

The backpacks were to be distributed between six orphans from six different orphanages in Gunma.

Second donation
A second donation was found by a security guard at the Odawara Child Guidance Center in Kanagawa Prefecture on 1 January 2011. Six backpacks, three black and three red, were left. A note left behind stated:

A New Year's gift — Naoto Date

The donation of backpacks in Gunma last year moved me deeply. My heart skipped a beat when I heard the news. Thinking I might do something as well, I offer these gifts. May the Tiger Mask movement live on.

As with the ten original backpacks in Gunma, they were left with a note signed by Naoto Date. The backpacks were to be distributed to new arrivals at the local orphanages and other children that Odawara Child Guidance center serves.

Copycat donations
Japan has around 580 children's centers that house around 30,000 children.

As of January 11, 2011, over 100 donations inspired by Tiger Mask have been reported across Japan. After the two initial donations, many other orphanages and children's facilities began to receive copycat donations of backpacks. Some have also received toys, food, and money to help pay for new backpacks. In addition, parallels to other anime and manga concerning orphaned children have also crept into the donation phenomenon.

2011 Tōhoku earthquake and tsunami
Sometime during the night of March 17 - morning of March 18, three cars parked at an evacuation center in Yamadamachi, Iwate had their tanks filled up and two 20-liter containers of heating oil were left outside the center by an unknown person. An evacuee discovered the donation upon starting his car and noticing his fuel gauge go from nearly empty to full. The evacuee noted: "We had hardly any fuel left. We were in a real pinch. I'm so grateful for the donation. I reckon it was Tiger Mask." The evacuation center noted that they would use the heating oil during the night to conserve fuel due to the ongoing crisis.  Other child welfare offices and agencies have reported increased, anonymous donations in the aftermath of the disaster.

Cultural aspects
Because tax benefits for charitable donations are limited in Japan, a culture of charity donations has never really taken root.  For example, the ratio of charitable donations by individuals in Japan is 52.5%, compared with 82.7% for the US.  Also, Japanese culture emphasizes modesty, which means that Japanese people are generally reluctant to do good deeds in public view.  Therefore, the Tiger Mask movement assuages both cultural inhibitions towards charitable deeds; it gives people in Japan a reason to donate while allowing them to do so anonymously.

Several donators left notes purportedly from other fictional characters from franchises outside the Tiger Mask series. Notable characters who "donated" include Rei Ayanami and Ryoji Kaji from Neon Genesis Evangelion, Haruhi Suzumiya, and Stitch. In April 2020, an anonymous donator left over 100 facemasks and other hygiene supplies at a nursing school in Ichinoseki, Iwate, claiming to be the character Inosuke Hashibira from the manga Demon Slayer: Kimetsu no Yaiba.

References

2010 in Japan
2011 in Japan
Giving
Charity in Japan